Ömer Lütfi Akadlı (1902–1988) was a Turkish judge. He was the president of the Constitutional Court of Turkey from
October 7, 1964 until July 8, 1966.

Notes

External links
Web site of the Constitutional Court of Turkey 

Turkish judges
Turkish civil servants
1902 births
1988 deaths
Presidents of the Constitutional Court of Turkey